United Nations Security Council Resolution 15, adopted unanimously on December 19, 1946, established a commission to investigate the nature of, and recommend a solution to, the alleged border violations along the frontier of Greece with Albania, Bulgaria and Yugoslavia.  The commission was to arrive on site no later than January 15, 1947, and issue a report to the Council as soon as possible.

See also
 United Nations Security Council Resolution 17
 List of United Nations Security Council Resolutions 1 to 100 (1946–1953)

References
Text of the Resolution at undocs.org

External links
 

 0015
1946 in Yugoslavia
Albania–Greece border
 0015
 0015
 0015
 0015
1946 in Bulgaria
1946 in Greece
1946 in Albania
December 1946 events